Buxton Mill, is located on the River Bure about  east of the village of Buxton, Norfolk, and is in the hamlet of Lamas, Norfolk. A watermill was recorded here in the Domesday Book. The present mill is thought to date from 1754 and was built by William Pepper, a merchant living in Buxton.

Description
The present mill is built over four storeys and is brick built with weatherboard cladding. The east elevation has three bays with gables. There is a timber lucam (covered sack hoist) of shiplap construction on the top floor of the middle bay which oversails the road below.

Power
At Buxton the river Bure was quite large with a powerful flow and with the diversion of the course there was a fall of 6 to 7 feet providing this mill with considerable power. The breastshot water wheel, which was sixteen foot, was installed in a separate brick built building which was located behind the mill house. This water wheel was replaced by a turbine in 1902. There was also a second waterwheel which was overshot using water that formed part of the Aylsham Navigation and gained its head by the close by lock system.
The 1902 turbine was small and revolved at a much faster pace which removed the need several of the gear wheels which on larger, slow moving water wheels waste considerable power out-put. In 1965 this turbine was still producing 25% of the mill's power requirements. It had undergone a minor overhaul in 1930 and a major overhaul in the 1960s that would have left it capable of running for the next 40 years. The mills power was used to drive two and sometimes three pairs of millstones, which were in regular use for grinding animal food stuffs. Flour for household use was also produced and biscuit flour was milled using electrically powered roller milling machines.

The Mill House
To the north side of the watermill stands the Mill House which was built in the Georgian period and has a fine ironwork porch. The rear section of the Mill House is thought to have been added soon after construction in the late 18th century, and is a former granary with corner posts, dragon beams and dragon braces.

To the eastern side lies the seventh largest private farm in England, owned by the Maynard Group

The mill was reconstructed after a devastating fire in Jan 1991 used as a case study covering the fire and the major reconstruction that followed. An excellent history can be found at Norfolk Mills. You can also stay in the apartments  at the mill.

References

External links
 Buxton Mill, Penthouse holiday apartment at Buxton Mill

Watermills in Norfolk
Watermills mentioned in the Domesday Book